A superorganism is a group of synergetically interacting organisms of the same species.

Superorganism may also refer to:

 Superorganism (band), English indie pop band.
 Superorganism (Superorganism album), the band's self-titled debut album
 Superorganism (Mickey Hart Band album)

See also 
 Largest organisms